The 1973–74 New York Islanders season was the second season for the New York Islanders franchise in the National Hockey League. During the regular season, the Islanders finished in eighth place in the East Division with a 19–41–18 record and did not qualify for the Stanley Cup playoffs for the second straight year.

Offseason

NHL Draft

Regular season

Final standings

Schedule and results

Playoffs

Player statistics

Note: Pos = Position; GP = Games played; G = Goals; A = Assists; Pts = Points; +/- = plus/minus; PIM = Penalty minutes; PPG = Power-play goals; SHG = Short-handed goals; GWG = Game-winning goals
      MIN = Minutes played; W = Wins; L = Losses; T = Ties; GA = Goals-against; GAA = Goals-against average; SO = Shutouts;

Awards and records

Transactions

Draft picks
The 1973 NHL Amateur Draft was  held on May 15, 1973, at the Mount Royal Hotel in Montreal, Quebec.

Farm teams

See also
1973–74 NHL season

References

External links

New York Islanders seasons
New York Islanders
New York Islanders
New York Islanders
New York Islanders